The 49th Assembly District of Wisconsin is one of 99 districts in the Wisconsin State Assembly.  Located in southwest Wisconsin, the district comprises all of Grant County, as well as the western half of Richland County and a small part of southwest Lafayette County.  It includes the cities of Boscobel, Cuba City, Fennimore, Lancaster, and Platteville, and the villages of Benton, Bloomington, Blue River, Boaz, Cassville, Dickeyville, Hazel Green, Livingston, Montfort, Muscoda, Potosi, Woodman, and Yuba, and the part of the village of Viola within Richland County.  The district also contains the University of Wisconsin–Platteville campus, Wyalusing State Park, and Nelson Dewey Memorial State Park, and historic landmarks such as the Potosi Brewery and the Grant County Courthouse.  The district is represented by Republican Travis Tranel, since January 2011.
 

The 49th Assembly district is located within Wisconsin's 17th Senate district, along with the 50th and 51st Assembly districts.

History

The district was created in the 1972 redistricting act (1971 Wisc. Act 304) which first established the numbered district system, replacing the previous system which allocated districts to specific counties.  Under the pre-1972 districting scheme, Grant County was a single-district county.  The 49th district was drawn mostly in line with the former Grant County district, but with several municipalities in the northwest portion of the state removed.  The last representative of the Grant County district, James N. Azim, Jr., was elected in 1972 as the first representative of the 49th Assembly district.

With the exception of the 1982 court-ordered redistricting plan, which scrambled all State Assembly districts, the 49th district has remained based in Grant County through fifty years of redistricting.  The boundaries have varied somewhat, utilizing different combinations of neighboring municipalities in Richland, Iowa, and Lafayette counties.

List of past representatives

References 

Wisconsin State Assembly districts
Grant County, Wisconsin
Lafayette County, Wisconsin
Richland County, Wisconsin